Droop Mountain Battlefield State Park is a state park located on Droop Mountain in Pocahontas County, West Virginia. The park was the site of the Battle of Droop Mountain, the last major battle of the American Civil War in the state taking place on November 6, 1863. John D. Sutton, a West Virginia private in the Union Army at the battle, became the leader in the movement to create the park when he served in the West Virginia House of Delegates. Dedicated on July 4, 1928, Droop Mountain Battlefield became the first state park in West Virginia.

The battlefield was transformed into a historical, outdoor recreation area by the Civilian Conservation Corps during the Great Depression. Public reenactments of the battle have been conducted in October of some  even-numbered years by the West Virginia Reenactors Association.

The park was placed on the National Register of Historic Places in 1970.

The park is also near Beartown State Park and Watoga State Park.

Features 
 Droop Mountain Museum with battle artifacts
 Lookout Tower
 hiking
 Picnic areas with shelters
 Tots playgrounds

Gallery

See also

American Civil War
Battle of Droop Mountain
List of West Virginia state parks 
State park
West Virginia in the American Civil War

References

Further reading

 Boge, Georgie and Margie Holder Boge. Paving Over the Past: A History and Guide to Civil War Battlefield Preservation. Washington, D.C.: Island Press, 1993. 
 Cook, Roy B. “The Battle of Droop Mountain.”  West Virginia Review. October 1928. 
 Lowry, Terry. Last Sleep: The Battle of Droop Mountain. Charleston, WV: Pictorial Histories Publishing Co., 1996. 
 “Program - Dedication of the Droop Mountain Battlefield as a State Park.” The Pocahontas Times. June 28, 1928.
 Report of the Droop Mountain Battlefield Commission. Charleston, WV: Jarrett Printing Co., 1928.
 Shaffer, Dallas B. The Battle at Droop Mountain. Charleston, WV: Department of Natural Resources.
 Smith, Timothy B. Altogether Fitting and Proper: Civil War Battlefield Preservation in History, Memory, and Policy, 1861-2015. Knoxville: University of Tennessee Press, 2017. 
 Snell, Mark A. West Virginia and the Civil War: Mountaineers Are Always Free. Charleston, SC: The History Press, 2011. 
 “State Park Dedicated - Big Crowd Celebrates the Fourth on Droop.” The Pocahontas Times. July 12, 1928.
 West Virginia State Park History Committee. Where People and Nature Meet: A History of the West Virginia State Parks. Charleston, WV: Pictorial Histories Publishing Co., 1988.

External links

 
Droop Mountain Museum 

Protected areas of Pocahontas County, West Virginia
State parks of West Virginia
Pocahontas County, West Virginia in the American Civil War
Battlefields of the Eastern Theater of the American Civil War
Parks on the National Register of Historic Places in West Virginia
Protected areas established in 1928
American Civil War museums in West Virginia
Museums in Pocahontas County, West Virginia
Civilian Conservation Corps in West Virginia
National Register of Historic Places in Pocahontas County, West Virginia
Conflict sites on the National Register of Historic Places in West Virginia
1928 establishments in West Virginia
IUCN Category III